The Stonewall Attack is a chess opening characterized by White (generally) playing their pawns to d4 and e3, playing Bd3, Nd2, and then playing pawns to c3 and then f4; although the moves are not always played in that order (see transposition). The Stonewall is a system; White heads for a very specific pawn formation, rather than trying to memorize long lines of different variations. If White puts up the Stonewall formation it is called the Stonewall Attack, regardless of how Black chooses to defend against it. When Black sets up a Stonewall formation, with pawns on c6, d5, e6 and f5, then it is a variation of the Dutch Defense. MCO-15 gives the following as a main line: 1.d4 d5 2.e3 Nf6 3.Bd3 c5 4.c3 Nc6 5.f4.

ECO
Since the Stonewall system is used against a variety of Black defenses, the Encyclopaedia of Chess Openings (ECO) has trouble classifying it. Among the codes used are D00 (when Black has played ...d5), A45, and A03 (the code for Bird's Opening).

Example game

This sample game illustrates what can happen if Black defends weakly.

1.d4 d5 2.f4 Nf6 3.e3 e6 4.Nf3 c5 5.c3 Nc6 6.Bd3 Bd6 7.0-0 0-0 8.Nbd2 b6 9.Ne5 Bb7 10.g4 Qc7 11.g5 Nd7 12.Bxh7+ Kxh7 13.Qh5+ Kg8 14.Rf3 f6 15.Rh3 fxe5 16.g6

References

Bibliography

 

Chess openings